Jubilee International Stamp Exhibition was held 14–19 October 1912 at the Royal Horticultural Hall, London. The principal organisers were Fred Melville, H.R.F. Johnson and H.H. Harland of the Junior Philatelic Society.

An "Ideal Stamp" was produced as a souvenir.

References

External links
http://www.tonylester.co.uk/may-2013-auction/

1912 in London
1912
October 1912 events